Swarnna Malsyam is a 1975 Indian Malayalam-language film, directed by B. K. Pottekkad and produced by P. M. Sreenivasan. The film stars Madhu, Jayabharathi, Adoor Bhasi and Thikkurissy Sukumaran Nair. The film has musical score by M. S. Baburaj.

Cast
 
Madhu 
Jayabharathi 
Adoor Bhasi 
Thikkurissy Sukumaran Nair 
Sreelatha Namboothiri 
Adoor Pankajam 
Khadeeja 
Rani Chandra

Soundtrack
The music was composed by M. S. Baburaj and the lyrics were written by Mankombu Gopalakrishnan.

References

External links
 

1975 films
1970s Malayalam-language films